Lecanora phryganitis is a species of lichen in the family Lecanoraceae. It was described as new to science in 1866 by American botanist Edward Tuckerman.

See also
List of Lecanora species

References

Lichen species
Lichens described in 1866
Lichens of North America
phryganitis
Taxa named by Edward Tuckerman